The western giant toad (Peltophryne fustiger) is a species of toad in the family Bufonidae that is endemic to western Cuba. It occurs in a range of habitats including broadleaf forest, grassland, savanna, and agricultural areas. It is a common species but it can be locally threatened by habitat loss.

References

fustiger
Amphibians described in 1960
Endemic fauna of Cuba
Amphibians of Cuba
Taxonomy articles created by Polbot